Joseph Thomas Maras (January 19, 1916 – September 17, 1990) was an American football player and coach. He played for three seasons for the Pittsburgh Steelers organization of the National Football League (NFL) from 1938 to 1940.  Maras served as the head football coach at Union University in Schenectady, New York from 1960 to 1963, compiling a record of 8–23–1. He played college football at Duquesne University in Pittsburgh and was selected in the tenth round of the 1938 NFL Draft by the Cleveland Rams.

Head coaching record

References

External links
 
 

1916 births
1990 deaths
American football centers
Columbia Lions football coaches
Duquesne Dukes football players
Pittsburgh Steelers players
Union Dutchmen football coaches
Junior college football players in the United States
Sportspeople from Hibbing, Minnesota
Players of American  football from Minnesota